Laércio Gomes Costa, sometimes known as Laércio Carreirinha or simply Laércio (born 3 February 1990) is a Brazilian footballer who plays as a striker for  club Akhaa Ahli Aley.

Career
Born in Caiabu, São Paulo, Laércio began his career in Profute's youth categories in 2006, moving to Avaí in August 2007. He was subsequently assigned to the youth side, being promoted to the first-team in 2010.

After struggling to make his breakthrough, Laércio moved to Boa Esporte on loan in 2011. However, after being sparingly used during the season, he returned to Avaí in December, with his side being relegated from Série A. In the following season, Laércio began being more utilized after the arrival of Argel Fucks; however, his contract was not renewed and he was subsequently released.

On 9 January 2013 Laércio joined América-MG. However, in August he moved to América-RN. In the following year Laércio joined lowly Tombense, leaving the side after only one match, and moving to Portuguesa.

Laércio left FC Banants following their last game before the winter break, in December 2016.

Career statistics

Club

Honours
Avai
Campeonato Catarinense: 2010,2012

Banants
Armenian Cup: 2015-2016

References

External links
ogol.com 

1990 births
Living people
Brazilian footballers
Association football forwards
Avaí FC players
América Futebol Clube (MG) players
América Futebol Clube (RN) players
Associação Portuguesa de Desportos players
Akhaa Ahli Aley FC players
Campeonato Brasileiro Série A players
Campeonato Brasileiro Série B players
Lebanese Premier League players
Brazilian expatriate footballers
Brazilian expatriate sportspeople in Lebanon
Expatriate footballers in Lebanon